The United Indian Patriotic Association was a political organisation founded in 1888 by Sir Syed Ahmad Khan (the founder of the Aligarh Muslim University) and Raja Shiv Prasad Singh of Benaras. Opposed to the Indian National Congress, the group aimed to develop close ties between the Muslim community and the British Raj.
The British officials encouraged reactionary elements like Sir Syed Ahmed Khan and Raja Shiv Prasad Singh of Benaras to organise the United Indian Patriotic Association in 1888 to counter Congress propaganda.

Indian independence movement
Establishments in British India
Aligarh Movement